William Edmund Butterworth III (November 10, 1929 – February 12, 2019), better known by his pen name W. E. B. Griffin, was an American writer of military and detective fiction with 59 novels in seven series published under that name. Twenty-one of those books were co-written with his son, William E Butterworth IV. He also published under 11 other pseudonyms and three versions of his real name (W. E. Butterworth, William E. Butterworth, and William E. Butterworth III).

Early life, education, and military service

Griffin grew up in New York City and Philadelphia. He joined the United States Army in 1946. His military occupation was counterintelligence and in this capacity he served in the Constabulary in Germany, thus earning the Army of Occupation Medal. One of Griffin's duties was delivering food to German general officers and their families, including the widow of would-be Hitler assassin Claus von Stauffenberg.  His exposure to German military and civilian aristocracy supplied much of the inspiration for such Griffin creations as Oberst Graf von Greiffenberg, who appears in several of the Brotherhood of War novels.

After completing his active duty military service, Griffin attended Philipps-Universität Marburg at Marburg-an-der-Lahn. His college days were cut short in 1951 when he was recalled to serve in the Korean War.

In Korea he first served as an official Army war correspondent with the 223rd Infantry Regiment, then as public information officer for U.S. X Corps, which included the 1st Marine Division. Griffin received the Combat Infantryman Badge for service at the front lines. His knowledge of combat and garrison life and his friendships with military personnel from different services would well serve his writing. Many of his books are dedicated to fallen comrades who died in Korea or later on in Vietnam or while serving with the international peacekeeping force dispatched during the Lebanese Civil War. Griffin was modest about his own service. He once told a Barnes & Noble interviewer:

Writing career
After the end of the Korean War, Griffin continued to work for the military in a civilian capacity as Chief of the Publications Division of the U.S. Army Signal Aviation Test & Support Activity at Fort Rucker, Alabama.  After his first three novels proved successful, he left this job to pursue writing full-time.  To date, he has 160 fiction and nonfiction works to his credit. He was well-known and respected in the literary world for his thrillers and crime novels.

His son William E. Butterworth IV (previously editor of Boys' Life, the magazine of the Boy Scouts of America) co-authored some of his books. Butterworth fils was a long-time editor who moved from assisting in editing his father's work to collaborator. As of July 2015, he has been co-author of sixteen Griffin books in five different novel series. He was the keynote speaker at the 2014 Mystery Writers Key West Fest.

Griffin's knowledge of military jargon and administrative writing style shows when fictional orders and dispatches are incorporated in his novels.  Many of his characters must battle red tape and bureaucratic mix-ups, sometimes making humorous end-runs around the system.

Griffin was the co-founder of the William E. Colby Seminar on Intelligence, Military, and Diplomatic Affairs at Norwich University in Vermont, along with his friend, historian and Patton biographer Colonel Carlo D'Este.  Griffin was a member of the Colby Circle, having participated in the William E. Colby Writers Symposium at Norwich University.

Family life
In 1950, Griffin married Emma Macalik, a ballet dancer and the author of As the Waltz Was Ending, a memoir of her life growing up as a dancer in Vienna during World War II. They had a daughter (Patricia) and two sons (John S. II and William E. IV). The marriage ended in divorce in the 1990s. Emma died from lung cancer in 2003.

Griffin later married Maria del Pilar Menendez, whom he had met in Argentina.  She died in 2018.

Griffin died in February 2019 from colorectal cancer at the age of 89.

List of written works
The following is the list of books written by W.E.B. Griffin: 

Written as W.E.B. Griffin
The Brotherhood of War Series (U.S. Army)
The Lieutenants  (1982),
The Captains  (1982), 
The Majors  (1983), 
The Colonels  (1983), 
The Berets  (1985), 
The Generals  (1986), 
The New Breed  (1987), 
The Aviators  (1988), 
Special Ops  (2001), 
The Corps Series (United States Marine Corps)
Semper Fi  (1986), 
Call to Arms  (1987), 
Counterattack  (1990), 
Battleground  (1991), 
Line of Fire  (1992), 
Close Combat  (1993), 
Behind the Lines  (1995), 
In Danger's Path  (1998), 
Under Fire  (2002),  
Retreat, Hell! (2004), 
Men at War Series (Office of Strategic Services/OSS in ETO) 
The Last Heroes (Originally published as In The Line of Duty under the pseudonym of Alex Baldwin) (1984)
The Secret Warriors (Originally published as Covert Operations under the pseudonym of Alex Baldwin) (1985)
The Soldier Spies (Originally published as Give me Liberty under the pseudonym of Alex Baldwin) (1986)
The Fighting Agents  (Originally published as Into Enemy Hands under the pseudonym of Alex Baldwin) (1989)
The Saboteurs (2007)  (with William E. Butterworth IV)
The Double Agents (2008)  (with William E. Butterworth IV)
The Spymasters (2012) (with William E. Butterworth IV),  
Badge of Honor Series (Philadelphia Police Department)
Men in Blue (Originally published under pseudonym John Kevin Dugan) (1988)
Special Operations (Originally published under pseudonym John Kevin Dugan)  (1989)
The Victim  (1991)
The Witness  (1992)
The Assassin  (1993)
The Murderers  (1994)
The Investigators  (1997)
Final Justice  (2003)
The Traffickers (2009) (with William E. Butterworth IV)
The Vigilantes (2010) (with William E. Butterworth IV)
The Last Witness (2013) (with William E. Butterworth IV), 
[[Deadly Assets (W.E.B. Griffin novel)|Deadly Assets]] (2015) (with William E. Butterworth IV), 
Broken Trust (2016) (with William E. Butterworth IV), 
The Attack (2019) (with William E. Butterworth IV), 
Honor Bound Series (OSS in South America)
Honor Bound  (1993)
Blood and Honor  (1996)
Secret Honor  (1999)
Death and Honor (2008) {with William E. Butterworth IV}
The Honor of Spies (2009) (with William E. Butterworth IV)
Victory and Honor (2011) (with William E. Butterworth IV)
Empire and Honor (2012) (with William E. Butterworth IV),  
The Presidential Agent Series (contemporary counterterrorism)
By Order of the President (2005)  
The Hostage (2006)  
The Hunters (2007)  
 The Shooters (2008)   
 Black Ops (2009)  
The Outlaws (2010) (with William E. Butterworth IV), 
Covert Warriors (2011) (with William E. Butterworth IV)  
Hazardous Duty (2013) (with William E. Butterworth IV)  
Clandestine Operations Series (early CIA)
Top Secret (2014) (with William E. Butterworth IV), 
The Assassination Option (2014) (with William E. Butterworth IV), 
Curtain of Death (2016) (with William E. Butterworth IV), 
Death at Nuremberg (2017) (with William E. Butterworth IV), 
The Enemy of My Enemy (2018)  (with William E. Butterworth IV), 
 Written with Richard Hooker as William E. Butterworth
M*A*S*H Series
M*A*S*H Goes to New Orleans (1974), 
M*A*S*H Goes to Paris (1974),  
M*A*S*H Goes to London (1975), 
M*A*S*H Goes to Vienna (1976), 
M*A*S*H Goes to San Francisco (1976)  
M*A*S*H Goes to Morocco (1976),  
M*A*S*H Goes to Miami (1976),  
M*A*S*H Goes to Las Vegas (1976),  
M*A*S*H Goes to Hollywood (1976),  
M*A*S*H Goes to Texas (1977),  
M*A*S*H Goes to Moscow (1977)  
M*A*S*H Goes to Montreal (1977),  
 Written under pseudonym of Webb Beech
No French Leave (1960)
Article 92: Murder-Rape (1965)
Warrior's Way (1965)
Make War in Madness (1966)
 Written under pseudonym of Walker E. Blake
Heartbreak Ridge (1962)
Hell on Wheels (1962)
The Girl in the Black Bikini (1962)
The Loved and the Lost (1962)
Once More With Passion (1964)
Doing What Comes Naturally (1965)

 Written under pseudonym of James McM. Douglas
Hunger For Racing (1967)
Racing to Glory (1969)
The Twelve-cylinder Screamer (1971)Drag Race Driver (1971)A Long Ride on a Cycle (1972)
Written under the pseudonym of Jack Dugan
The Deep Kill (1984)
 Written under pseudonym of Eden HughesThe Wiltons (1980)The Selkerks (1982)
 Written under pseudonym of Allison Mitchell
Wild Harvest (1983)
Wild Heritage (1984)
 Written under pseudonym of Edmund O. ScholefieldL'il Wildcat (1965)Tiger Rookie (1966)Bryan's Dog (1967)Maverick on the Mound (1968)Yankee Boy (1970)
Written under the pseudonym of Blakely St. JamesChristina's Passion (1977)
 Written under pseudonym of Patrick J. WilliamsReturn to Daytona (1962)Flat Out (1965)Fastest Funny Car (1967)Grad Prix Racing (1968)The Green Ghost (1968)Racing Mechanic (1971)Team Racer (1972)
 Written as W. E. Butterworth, William E. Butterworth, or William E. Butterworth, IIIComfort Me With Love (1959)Hot Seat (1959)The Love-Go-Round (1960)Where We Go From Here (1961)The Court-Martial (1962)The Wonders of Astronomy (1964)The Wonders of Rockets and Missiles (1965)Fast Green Car (or Flat Out) (1965)Stock-car Racer (1966)Air Evac (1967)Soldiers on Horseback; The Story of the United States Cavalry (1966)The Image Makers (1967)Helicopter Pilot (1967)Road Racer (1967)Orders to Vietnam (1968)Redline 7100 (1968)Grand Prix Driver (1969)Stop and Search (1969)The Wheel of a Fast Car (1969)Up to the Quarterback (1969)Fast and Smart (1970)Marty and the Micromidgets (1970) (later as Micro-Midget Racer (1973))Susan and Her Classic Convertible (1970)Steve Bellamy (1970)Stars and Planets (1970)Moving West on 122 (1971)Crazy to Race (1971)My Father's Quite a Guy (1971)Flying Army; The Modern Air Arm of the U.S. Army (1971)Return to Racing (1971)Wheels and Pistons; The Story of the Automobile (1971)The High Wind: the Story of NASCAR Racing (1971)The Sex Traveler (1971)Dateline: Talladega (1972)The Narc (1972)Skyjacked (1972)The Race Driver (1972)Flying Army: The Modern Air Arm of the U.S. Army (1973)Hot Wire (1973)Race Car Team (1973)Yankee Driver (1973)Dave White and the Electric Wonder Car (1974)Stop, Thief! (1974)Tires and Other Things: Some Heroes of Automotive Evolution (1975)Careers in the Armed Services (1976)Mighty Minicycles' (1976)
The Roper Brothers and Their Magnificent Steam Automobile (1976)
An Album of Automobile Racing (1977)
Black Gold : The Story of Oil (1977)
Hifi — From Edison's Phonograph to Quadraphonic Sound (1977)
The Air Freight Mystery (1978)
Next Stop, Earth (1978)
The Tank Driver (1978)
The Hotel Mystery (1979)
The Wrecker Driver (1979)
Under the Influence (1980)
Slaughter by Auto (1980)
Leroy and the Old Man (1980) .
Flunking Out (1981)
A Member of the Family (1982)Moose, the Thing, and Me (1982)The Hunting Trip''  (2015)

References

External links
 
Barnes & Noble interview
Discusses The Hostage at the Pritzker Military Museum & Library

1929 births
Military personnel from Newark, New Jersey
Writers from Newark, New Jersey
20th-century American novelists
21st-century American novelists
American military writers
American historical novelists
American male novelists
United States Army soldiers
United States Army personnel of the Korean War
American people of Dutch descent
20th-century American male writers
21st-century American male writers
20th-century American non-fiction writers
21st-century American non-fiction writers
American male non-fiction writers
2019 deaths